Protein kinase C and casein kinase substrate in neurons protein 2 (Pacsin 2) is a protein that in humans is encoded by the PACSIN2 gene. Pacsin 2 is involved in the formation of caveolae.

The variant rs2413739 in PACSIN2 has been associated with the activity of the enzyme thiopurine-methyltransferase during remission maintenance therapy of children with acute lymphoblastic leukemia and with the incidence of severe gastrointestinal adverse events during remission consolidation therapy of children with acute lymphoblastic leukemia, based mostly on the antimetabolites mercaptopurine and methotrexate.

Interactions 

PACSIN2 has been shown to interact with:
 Fas ligand,
 PACSIN1,  and
 PACSIN3.

References

Further reading